The Prix France Télévisions are annual literary awards in France. Since 1995, the national television broadcaster France Télévisions has awarded two prizes, for a novel and an essay. The judging panel consists of 15 television viewers chosen from across France, on the basis of their cover letters.

Winners of the France Télévisions novel prize
 1995: Florence Seyvos, Les Apparitions (Éditions de l'Olivier)
 1996: Jean-Paul Dubois, Kennedy et moi (Seuil)
 1997: Louis Gardel, L'Aurore des bien-aimés (Seuil)
 1998: Paule Constant, Confidence pour confidence (Gallimard)
 1999: Michèle Desbordes, La Demande
 2000: Dominique Jamet, Un petit Parisien 1941-1945 (Flammarion)
 2000: Philippe Claudel, J'abandonne
 2001: François Vallejo, Madame Angeloso
 2002: Jean-Pierre Milovanoff, La Mélancolie des innocents (Grasset)
 2003: Serge Joncour, 
 2004: Éric Fottorino, Korsakov ([Gallimard)
 2005: Franck Pavloff, Le Pont de Ran-Mositar (Albin Michel)
 2006: Nancy Huston,   (Actes Sud)
 2007: Olivier Adam, À l'abri de rien  (L'Olivier)
 2008: Yasmina Khadra, Ce que le jour doit à la nuit (Julliard)
 2009: Véronique Ovaldé,  (L'Olivier)
 2010: Jérôme Ferrari, Où j'ai laissé mon âme (Actes Sud)
 2011: Delphine de Vigan,  (JC Lattès)
 2012: Antoine Choplin, La Nuit tombée (Éditions La fosse aux ours)
 2013: Pierre Lemaitre, Au revoir là-haut (Albin Michel)
 2014: Éric Reinhardt,  (Gallimard)
 2016: Olivier Bourdeaut, En attendant Bojangles (Éditions Finitude)
 2017: Nathacha Appanah, Tropique de la violence (Gallimard)
 2018: Michel Bernard, Le Bon Cœur (La Table ronde)
 2019: Ali Zamir, Dérangé que je suis (Le Tripode)
 2020: Amanda Sthers, Lettre d'amour sans le dire (Grasset)

Winners of the France Télévisions essay prize
 1995: Mona Ozouf, Les Mots des femmes (Fayard)
 1996: Olivier Todd,  Albert Camus, une vie (Gallimard)
 1997: Antoine de Baecque, Serge Toubiana, François Truffaut (Gallimard)
 1998: Xavier Darcos, Mérimée (Flammarion)
 1999: Michel Baridon, Les Jardins : Paysagistes, jardiniers, poètes (Robert Laffont)
 2000: Dominique Jamet, Un petit parisien, 1941-1945 (Flammarion)
 2001: Roger-Pol Droit, 101 expériences de philosophie quotidienne
 2002: Patrick Declerck, Les Naufragés (Plon)
 2003: Jérôme Garcin, Théâtre intime (Gallimard)
 2004: Stephen Smith, Négrologie : pourquoi l'Afrique meurt (Calmann-Lévy)
 2005: Jean-Pierre Vernant, La Traversée des frontières (Seuil)
 2006: Hubert Prolongeau, Victoire sur l'excision : Pierre Foldes, le chirurgien qui redonne l'espoir aux femmes mutilées (Albin Michel)
 2007: Alain Bentolila, Le Verbe contre la barbarie : Apprendre à nos enfants à vivre ensemble (Odile Jacob)
 2008: Wassyla Tamzali, Une éducation algérienne : De la révolution à la décennie noire (Gallimard)
 2009: Dominique Fernandez, Ramon (Grasset)
 2010: Guillaume de Fonclare, Dans ma peau (Stock)
 2011: Michel Pastoureau, Les Couleurs de nos souvenirs (Seuil)
 2012: Rithy Panh, L’Élimination (Grasset)
 2013: Nicolas Werth La Route de la Kolyma 
 2014: Gilles Lapouge L’Âne et l’Abeille  (Albin Michel)
 2015: Emmanuel de Waresquiel Fouché, les silences de la pieuvre (Editions Fayard)
 2016: Mathias Malzieu Journal d'un vampire en pyjama (Albin Michel)
 2017: Patrizia Paterlini-Bréchot, Tuer le cancer (Stock)
 2018: Ivan Jablonka, En camping-car (Seuil)
 2019: Valérie Zenatti, Dans le faisceau des vivants (L'Olivier)
 2020: François Durpaire, Histoire mondiale du bonheur (Le Cherche midi)

External links 
 Olivier Bourdeaut et Mathias Malzieu lauréats des Prix France Télévisions on France Info (17/03/2016)
 Prix Roman France Télévisions on Livres hebdo (17/03/2016)
  Les lauréats du prix France Télévisions on France 5 (17/03/2016)

French literary awards
Awards established in 1995
1995 establishments in France